García de Sahagún was  a 16th-century Bishop of the Roman Catholic Church.

He was the Titular Bishop of Berytus (The Roman Catholic Diocese in Beirut, Lebanon). and the Diocese of Cuenca.

He was a member of the Order of the Blessed Virgin Mary of Mercy.

References

Year of birth missing
Year of death missing
Bishops of Cuenca